Opaganib (ABC294640) is a drug which acts as an inhibitor of the enzyme sphingosine kinase 2. It is under development as a potential treatment agent for several different kinds of cancer.

References 

Antineoplastic and immunomodulating drugs